Zene Baker is an American film editor. A native of Raleigh, North Carolina, Baker is a 1998 graduate of The North Carolina School of the Arts where he received a Bachelor of Fine Arts in film editing. Baker is best known as the editor of the Seth Rogen's films Observe and Report, 50/50, This Is the End, Neighbors, The Interview, The Night Before and Neighbors 2: Sorority Rising

In addition, Baker also edited Seeking a Friend for the End of the World. He is represented by United Talent Agency.

Filmography

References

External links

People from Raleigh, North Carolina
University of North Carolina School of the Arts alumni
American film editors
Living people
Year of birth missing (living people)